Proença  is a Portuguese language surname. It may refer to:

People
Helder Proença (died 2009), Guinea-Bissauan politician
João Uva de Matos Proença (1938-1990), Portuguese diplomat
Maitê Proença (born 1958), Brazilian actress
Pedro Proença (born 1970), Portuguese football referee
Raul Proença (1884-1941), Portuguese writer and journalist

Places
Proença-a-Nova, a municipality in the district of Castelo Branco, Portugal

Portuguese-language surnames